The Communion of Protestant Churches in Europe (CPCE, also GEKE for Gemeinschaft Evangelischer Kirchen in Europa) is a fellowship of over 100 Protestant churches which have signed the Leuenberg Agreement. Together they strive for realizing church communion, especially by cooperation in witness and service to the world. Prior to 2003 the CPCE was known as the "Leuenberg Church Fellowship".

In membership are most Lutheran and Reformed churches in Europe, the united churches that originated from mergers of those churches, and such pre-Reformation churches as the Waldensians. The European Methodist churches joined the CPCE by a common declaration of church fellowship in 1997.

The General Secretary of the CPCE is the Reverend Dr Mario Fischer. The Community's offices are located in Vienna, Austria, and are shared with those of the Evangelical Church of the Augsburg Confession in Austria.

History 
In 1973, theologians from major European Lutheran and Reformed churches met at the Swiss conference centre Leuenberg (near Basel) and finalized the Leuenberg Agreement or Leuenberg Concord, an ecumenical document declaring unity through Jesus Christ. Under this agreement the churches agree on a common understanding of the Gospel, including elementary agreement on important doctrines including christology, predestination, Eucharist and justification. They declare church fellowship, understood as pulpit and table fellowship as well as full communion in witness and service.

The churches involved were originally joined in an organization called the "Leuenberg Church Fellowship". In 2003 this was renamed the "Community (since 2020: "Communion") of Protestant Churches in Europe" as a sign of growing beyond the Lutheran and Reformed traditions, and now includes several Methodist churches. Since then, the CPCE has started ecumenical dialogue with Anglican, Baptist, and Orthodox churches.

In 2006, the CPCE published a statute of church constitution, and in 2011 published new guidelines for churches wishing to join. This declaration made clear that "churches wishing to join recognize the ordination and ministry of women ministers in other CPCE churches".

Member churches

European countries 

Iceland
 Church of Iceland
Norway
Church of Norway
Denmark
 Church of Denmark
 Reformed Synod of Denmark
United Kingdom
 Church of Scotland
 German-Speaking Evangelical-Lutheran Synod in Great Britain
 Presbyterian Church of Wales
 Methodist Church in Ireland
 Methodist Church of Great Britain
 United Free Church of Scotland
 United Reformed Church
Ireland
 Lutheran Church in Ireland
 Presbyterian Church in Ireland
Netherland
 Protestant Church in the Netherlands
 Remonstrant Brotherhood
Luxembourg
 Protestant Church of Luxembourg
 Protestant Reformed Church of Luxembourg
Austria
 Evangelical Church of the Augsburg Confession in Austria
 Reformed Church in Austria
Liechtenstein
 Evangelical Church in Liechtenstein
Germany
 Evangelical Church in Germany
 Evangelical Reformed Church in Germany
 Union of Evangelical Churches
 Conference of Churches on the Rhine
 
 Evangelical Lutheran Church in Northern Germany
 Evangelical Lutheran Church of Mecklenburg
 Pomeranian Evangelical Church
 Evangelical Lutheran Church in Oldenburg
 Evangelical Lutheran Church in Bavaria
 Evangelical Church of Bremen
 Evangelical Church in Berlin, Brandenburg and Silesian Upper Lusatia
 Evangelical Church of Anhalt
 Evangelical Church in Central Germany
 Evangelical Lutheran Church in Brunswick
 Evangelical-Lutheran Church of Hanover
 Evangelical Lutheran Church of Schaumburg-Lippe
 Church of Lippe
 Evangelical Church of Westphalia
 Evangelical-Lutheran Church of Saxony
 Evangelical Church of Hesse Electorate-Waldeck
 Protestant Church in Hesse and Nassau
 Evangelical Church in the Rhineland
 
 Evangelical Church of the Palatinate
 Protestant Church in Baden
 Evangelical-Lutheran Church in Württemberg
 Evangelical Reformed Church in Bavaria and Northwestern Germany
 Evangelical Lutheran Church of Lithuania in Exile (Germany)
 Switzerland 
 Protestant Church of Switzerland
 Federation of Evangelical Lutheran Churches in Switzerland and the Principality of Liechtenstein
 France
 United Protestant Church of France 
 Evangelical Lutheran Church of France 
 Reformed Church of France)
 Union of Protestant Churches of Alsace and Lorraine
 Protestant Reformed Church of Alsace and Lorraine
 Protestant Church of Augsburg Confession of Alsace and Lorraine
 Belgium
 United Protestant Church in Belgium
 Spain
 Spanish Evangelical Church
 Portugal
 
 Evangelical Presbyterian Church of Portugal
 Italy
 Union of Methodist and Waldensian Churches
 Waldensian Evangelical Church
 Methodist Church in Italy
 Lutheran Evangelical Church in Italy
 Romania
 Evangelical Lutheran Church of Romania
 Reformed Church in Romania
 Reformed Diocese of Királyhágómellék
 Reformed Diocese of Transylvania
 Evangelical Church of Augustan Confession in Romania
 Greece
 Greek Evangelical Church
 
 Croatia
 Evangelical Church in the Republic of Croatia
 Reformed Christian Church in Croatia
 Slovenia
 Evangelical Church of Slovenia
 Serbia
 Slovak Evangelical Church of the Augsburg Confession in Serbia
 Reformed Christian Church in Serbia
 Hungary
 Evangelical-Lutheran Church in Hungary
 Reformed Church in Hungary
 Slovakia
 Evangelical Church of the Augsburg Confession in Slovakia
 Reformed Christian Church in Slovakia
 Czech Republic
 Czechoslovak Hussite Church
 Church of the Brethren in the Czech Republic
 Evangelical Church of Czech Brethren
 Silesian Evangelical Church of the Augsburg Confession
Poland
 Polish Reformed Church
 Evangelical Church of the Augsburg Confession in Poland
Ukraine
 Reformed Church in Transcarpathia
 Russia
 Evangelical Lutheran Church in Russia, Ukraine, Kazakhstan and Central Asia
 Estonia
 Estonian Evangelical Lutheran Church
 Latvia
 Evangelical Lutheran Church of Latvia
Lithuania
 Evangelical Lutheran Church in Lithuania
 Lithuanian Evangelical Reformed Church

Other countries 
 Argentina
 United Evangelical Lutheran Church in Argentina
 Evangelical Methodist Church in Argentina
 Reformed Church of Argentina
 Argentina – Uruguay – Paraguay
 Waldensian Church of the River Plate
 Evangelical Church of the River Plate
 Ecuador
 Iglesia Evangélica Luterana del Ecuador (Evangelical Lutheran church of Ecuador)

International churches 
 United Methodist Church
 Central and Southern Europe Central Conference
 Germany Central Conference
 Northern Europe Central Conference
 United Methodist church, Nordic and Baltic Area
 United Methodist Church Eurasia Episcopal Area
 Moravian Church
 Latvian Evangelical Lutheran Church Abroad

Participating churches 
 Sweden 
Church of Sweden
Uniting Church in Sweden (part of the Swedish Free Church Council)
 Finland
Evangelical Lutheran Church of Finland

See also

 Porvoo Communion

References

External links

A history of the Leuenberg Agreement

International organisations based in Vienna
Protestant ecumenism
 
Christian ecumenical organizations
20th-century Lutheranism
20th-century Calvinism
1973 in Christianity
1973 documents
Church of Scotland